Heinrich Hofmann may refer to:

Heinrich Hofmann (composer) (1842–1902), German composer and pianist
Heinrich Hofmann (painter) (1824–1911), German painter

See also
Heinrich Hoffmann (disambiguation)